Tiago Fernandes announced that fatigue and back pain forced him to give up playing the final match, which was scheduled for 19:30 against the Japanese Tatsuma Ito. Ito won this tournament.

Seeds

Draw

Finals

Top half

Bottom half

References
 Main Draw
 Qualifying Draw

Pernambuco Brasil Open Series - Singles